Fortanete is a municipality located in the province of Teruel, Aragon, Spain. According to the 2004 census (INE), the municipality has a population of 202 inhabitants.

Demographics
Population trend since 1842.

Photo gallery

References

External links
Fortanete on Diputación de Teruel
Interview with Lionel Martorell, one of the last transhumant pastors in Eastern Spain

Municipalities in the Province of Teruel
Maestrazgo